Rake is a town in Winnebago County, Iowa, United States. The population was 186 at the time of the 2020 census. Its ZIP code is 50465.

History
Rake was platted in 1900. The community was named after Andrew Danielson Rake, a pioneer citizen of the area.

Geography
Rake is located at  (43.483451, -93.919498).

Demographics

2010 census
As of the census of 2010, there were 225 people, 102 households, and 58 families living in the town. The racial makeup of the town was 91.1% White, 0.4% Native American, 7.1% from other races, and 1.3% from two or more races. Hispanic or Latino of any race were 19.6% of the population.

There were 102 households, of which 22.5% had children under the age of 18 living with them, 38.2% were married couples living together, 10.8% had a female householder with no husband present, 7.8% had a male householder with no wife present, and 43.1% were non-families. 34.3% of all households were made up of individuals, and 18.7% had someone living alone who was 65 years of age or older. The average household size was 2.21 and the average family size was 2.83.

The median age in the town was 41.7 years. 19.6% of residents were under the age of 18; 5.7% were between the ages of 18 and 24; 27.5% were from 25 to 44; 25.8% were from 45 to 64; and 21.3% were 65 years of age or older. The gender makeup of the town was 53.8% male and 46.2% female.

2000 census
As of the census of 2000, there were 227 people, 110 households, and 53 families living in the town. The racial makeup of the town was 92.51% White, 1.76% Native American, 5.73% from other races. Hispanic or Latino of any race were 7.93% of the population.

There were 110 households, out of which 19.1% had children under the age of 18 living with them, 40.0% were married couples living together, 3.6% had a female householder with no husband present, and 51.8% were non-families. 44.5% of all households were made up of individuals, and 29.1% had someone living alone who was 65 years of age or older. The average household size was 2.06 and the average family size was 2.89.

In the town, the population was spread out, with 21.1% under the age of 18, 9.3% from 18 to 24, 24.2% from 25 to 44, 22.0% from 45 to 64, and 23.3% who were 65 years of age or older. The median age was 40 years. For every 100 females, there were 100.9 males. For every 100 females age 18 and over, there were 105.7 males.

The median income for a household in the town was $24,375, and the median income for a family was $33,750. Males had a median income of $25,357 versus $20,625 for females. The per capita income for the town was $15,816. About 7.7% of families and 13.1% of the population were below the poverty line, including 8.5% of those under the age of eighteen and 26.2% of those 65 or over.

Education
Rake is located within the North Iowa Community School District, which was established on July 1, 1996, by the merger of the Buffalo Center–Rake–Lakota Community School District and the Thompson Community School District. The Rake Community School District had consolidated with the Buffalo Center Community School District on July 1, 1978, to form the Buffalo Center–Rake district. On July 1, 1992, that district merged with the Lakota Consolidated School District to form the Buffalo Center–Rake–Lakota district, and that district merged into North Iowa in 1996.

References

Official Website:
 Rake, Iowa

Cities in Winnebago County, Iowa
Cities in Iowa
1900 establishments in Iowa